The Westminster Court of Burgesses was established by Act of Parliament in 1585 and abolished in 1900. It formed part of the local government of the City and Liberty of Westminster in  London, England.

The court was set up following the dissolution of the monasteries, filling a power vacuum created by Westminster Abbey ceasing to exert control over the area.

Initially it had the powers to deal with nuisances and adjudicate the prosecutions of some minor criminal offences. The parishes that made up the city continued to have self governance through their vestries. After justices of the peace were set up for Westminster in 1618, the court dealt with lesser cases such as offences relating to weights and measures.

The Westminster area was incorporated as the Metropolitan Borough of Westminster in 1900 and the court, as well as the parish vestries, were replaced by Westminster City Council.

References

1585 establishments in England
1900 disestablishments in England
History of the City of Westminster